Heracleides of Gyrton in Thessaly, commanded the Thessalian cavalry in the army of Philip V of Macedon at the Battle of Cynoscephalae.

Notes

Second Macedonian War
3rd-century BC Greek people
2nd-century BC Greek people
Ancient Thessalian generals